Dioon angustifolium is a species of cycad that is endemic to Tamaulipas and Nuevo León, Mexico.

Distribution
Plants occur in two main areas:
the Sierra Madre Oriental and the Sierra de San Carlos, Sierra de Tamaulipas
low hills in the vicinity of Soto la Marina, Tamaulipas

References

External links
 
 

angustifolium
Endemic flora of Mexico
Flora of the Sierra Madre Oriental